The New Zealand cricket team toured Australia in September 2022 to play three One Day International (ODI) matches. The ODI matches were played for the Chappell–Hadlee Trophy, and formed part of the inaugural 2020–2023 ICC Cricket World Cup Super League. In May 2022, Cricket Australia confirmed the fixtures for the tour.

On 10 September 2022, Aaron Finch announced his retirement from ODI cricket ahead of the third ODI.

Background
Originally the tour was scheduled to take place in January and February 2021. On 28 May 2020, Cricket Australia confirmed the fixtures for the series. However, in September 2020, Cricket Australia were looking at moving the series wholly into February 2021, to avoid clashing with the end of the 2020–21 Big Bash League season. Later the same month, the tour was postponed due to the COVID-19 pandemic. Cricket Australia confirmed a revised schedule in May 2021. On 19 January 2022, the tour was postponed due to uncertainty of the New Zealand players' quarantine requirements after they return back home.

Squads

Before the start of the series, Josh Inglis was added to Australia's squad in place of Mitchell Marsh. On the eve of the third ODI, Marcus Stoinis was ruled out due to side strain and David Warner released, with Nathan Ellis added to Australia's squad.

ODI series

1st ODI

2nd ODI

3rd ODI

References

External links
 Series home at ESPNcricinfo

2022 in Australian cricket
2022 in New Zealand cricket
International cricket competitions in 2022–23
2022-23
Cricket events postponed due to the COVID-19 pandemic